Ocresia pallidalis is a species of snout moth, and the type species of the genus Ocresia. It was described by Herbert Druce in 1902. It is found in Costa Rica.

References

Moths described in 1891
Chrysauginae
Taxa named by Herbert Druce